Per-Arne Mikael Håkansson (born 1963) is a Swedish politician, journalist and member of the Riksdag, the national legislature. A member of the Social Democratic Party, he has represented Skåne County North and East since September 2014.

Håkansson is the son of foreman Gert Håkansson and finance assistant Anna-Lisa Håkansson (née Persson). He was a journalist at the Helsingborgs Dagblad (1983) and Arbetet (1983-1999). He was a board member of Sundspärlan AB (2000-2019) and a program manager at Radio FM Helsingborg. He has been a member of the municipal council in Åstorp Municipality since 2008.

References

1963 births
Living people
Members of the Riksdag 2014–2018
Members of the Riksdag 2018–2022
Members of the Riksdag 2022–2026
Members of the Riksdag from the Social Democrats
People from Åstorp Municipality
Swedish journalists